Richard J. Cole is a Silver Professor of Computer Science at the Courant Institute of Mathematical Sciences, New York University, and works on the Design and Analysis of Computer Algorithms.

Research
His research areas include algorithmic economic market theory and game theory, string and pattern matching, amortization, parallelism, and network and routing problems. His notable research contributions include an optimal parallel algorithm for sorting in the PRAM model, and an optimal analysis of the Boyer–Moore string-search algorithm.

References

External links

Living people
American computer scientists
People educated at Ealing County Grammar School for Boys
Alumni of University College, Oxford
Cornell University alumni
Courant Institute of Mathematical Sciences faculty
Fellows of the Association for Computing Machinery
20th-century American mathematicians
21st-century American mathematicians
20th-century American engineers
21st-century American engineers
20th-century American scientists
21st-century American scientists
Computer science educators
1957 births